The Brazos River Authority or BRA was created in 1929 by the Texas Legislature as a quasi-governmental entity to manage the Brazos River as a water resource in Texas.  It was originally named the Brazos River Conservation and Reclamation District and renamed to the current name in 1953. The central office is located at 4600 Cobbs Drive in Waco.

Reservoirs 
The Brazos River Authority manages dams that create three reservoirs on the Brazos River and its tributaries:

 Lake Granbury on the Brazos River
 Lake Limestone on the Navasota River
 Possum Kingdom Lake on the Brazos River

The Authority will also manage the dam that will create Allens Creek Reservoir on Allens Creek, in the event it is ever built.

See also 

 List of Texas river authorities

References 

Brazos River
River authorities of Texas
State agencies of Texas
Water companies of the United States
Companies based in Waco, Texas
Public utilities established in 1929
1929 establishments in Texas